Meru Kimura (born 27 June 2001), is a professional footballer who plays as a centre-back for Liga 1 club PSIS Semarang.

Club career

PSKC Cimahi
Ahead of the third match of Group B of the 2021–22 Liga 2 competition, PSKC Cimahi has officially signed a young player with Japanese blood, Meru Kimura. Before joining PSKC Cimahi, Meru Kimura played for Bali United Youth and had played for Persik Kediri. In addition, he also took part in the selection at Persebaya Surabaya.

RANS Nusantara F.C.
He was signed for RANS Nusantara to play in 2022–23 Liga 1.

PSIS Semarang (loan)
PSIS Semarang has again brought in players in the 2022–23 Liga 1 half-season transfer market. This time Laskar Mahesa Jenar brought in defender Meru Kimura on loan from RANS Nusantara. The 21-year-old player was brought in to add depth to the squad at the back. Meru made his professional debut on 16 January 2023 in a match against RANS Nusantara at the Pakansari Stadium, Bogor.

Career statistics

Club

References

External links
 Meru Kimura at Soccerway
  Meru Kimura at Liga Indonesia

2001 births
Living people
Indonesian footballers
Indonesian people of Japanese descent
Association football defenders
Liga 2 (Indonesia) players
Liga 1 (Indonesia) players
PSIS Semarang players
RANS Nusantara F.C. players
Sportspeople from Tokyo